The Victoria Athletics were a Western International League baseball team based in Victoria, British Columbia, Canada that existed from 1946 to 1951. From 1947 to 1949, they were affiliated with the New York Yankees. They played their home games at Royal Athletic Park.

Gil McDougald played for them.

References

Baseball teams established in 1946
Sports clubs disestablished in 1951
Defunct minor league baseball teams
Defunct baseball teams in Canada
Baseball teams in British Columbia
New York Yankees minor league affiliates
1946 establishments in British Columbia
1951 disestablishments in British Columbia
Baseball teams disestablished in 1951